Thomas Frederick Peart, Baron Peart, PC (30 April 1914 – 26 August 1988) was a British Labour politician who served in the Labour governments of the 1960s and 1970s and was a candidate for Deputy Leader of the Party.

Early life and education
The son of Emerson Featherstone Peart, a headmaster and leading Labour member of Durham County Council, and Florence Blissenden, Peart himself qualified as a teacher at the University of Durham in 1936. During his time at university he was President of the Durham Union for Epiphany term of 1936. He served in the Royal Artillery in World War II, gaining the rank of captain.

Political career
Peart was elected Member of Parliament for Workington in 1945, serving until 1976. He initially served as PPS to the Minister of Agriculture & Fisheries (Tom Williams).

Peart, along with the rest of the Labour Party, went into opposition after Sir Winston Churchill's 1951 election victory. In 1964, he returned to government after Harold Wilson defeated Sir Alec Douglas-Home at that year's election. He was appointed to the Cabinet holding the Cabinet post of Minister of Agriculture, Fisheries and Food. His tenure saw advances in pay for agricultural labourers, and in technology.
In 1968, Peart became Lord Privy Seal, with no particular responsibilities. Seven months later, Peart became Leader of the House of Commons, taking the subsidiary title Lord President of the Council. After Labour lost the 1970 election, Peart returned to opposition as Shadow Leader of the House of Commons. He held that position until December 1971, when he became Shadow Agriculture Minister. When Labour returned to power, Peart once more took the Agriculture portfolio.

On 6 June 1975, Peart was involved in a train accident; he was on board a London to Glasgow sleeper train which crashed at Nuneaton, he survived the accident with minor injuries.

On 23 September 1976, Peart was created a life peer as Baron Peart, of Workington in the County of Cumbria, to serve as Leader of the House of Lords and Lord Privy Seal at a time when the Labour faction in the Lords was tiny compared to the vast Tory majority, mainly composed of hereditary peers.

After Margaret Thatcher won the 1979 election, Peart continued as Leader of the Labour Peers and thus became Shadow Leader of the House of Lords. He served in those roles until 1982, when he was defeated for re-election by Lord Cledwyn of Penrhos in a vote among Labour peers.

See also
 List of Durham University people
 List of presidents of the Durham Union

References

External links 
 

|-

|-

|-

|-

|-

|-

|-

|-

|-

|-

|-

1914 births
1988 deaths
Agriculture ministers of the United Kingdom
Alumni of the College of the Venerable Bede, Durham
British Army personnel of World War II
Cumbria MPs
GMB (trade union)-sponsored MPs
Labour Party (UK) MPs for English constituencies
Labour Party (UK) life peers
Leaders of the House of Commons of the United Kingdom
Leaders of the House of Lords
Lord Presidents of the Council
Lords Privy Seal
Members of the Privy Council of the United Kingdom
Ministers in the Wilson governments, 1964–1970
Presidents of the Durham Union
Royal Artillery officers
UK MPs 1945–1950
UK MPs 1950–1951
UK MPs 1951–1955
UK MPs 1955–1959
UK MPs 1959–1964
UK MPs 1964–1966
UK MPs 1966–1970
UK MPs 1970–1974
UK MPs 1974
UK MPs 1974–1979
UK MPs who were granted peerages
Life peers created by Elizabeth II